The 2005–06 Washington Huskies men's basketball team represented the University of Washington in the 2005–06 NCAA Division I men's basketball season. In head coach Lorenzo Romar's 4th season at the University of Washington, the Huskies played their home games at Bank of America Arena and were members of the Pacific-10 Conference. They finished the season 26–7, 13–5 in Pac-10 play and finished second in the Pac–10 regular season's final standings behind UCLA. They earned a 5 seed in the East Regional of the NCAA tournament, where they defeated 12th seeded Utah State in the 1st round, 4th seeded Illinois in the second round and eventually falling 98–92 in overtime to the region's 1 seed, UConn, in the Sweet 16. This was the 3rd straight season that the Huskies had appeared in the NCAA Tournament and 2nd straight year that they made it to the Sweet 16.

Roster

Source

 Denotes the use of a redshirt season

Coaching staff

Source

Schedule
Source

|-
!colspan=9 style="background:#363c74; color:#e8d3a2;"| Exhibition

|-
!colspan=9 style="background:#363c74; color:#e8d3a2;"| Regular Season

|-

|-

|-

|-

|-

|-

|-

|-

|-

|-

|-

|-

|-

|-

|-

|-

|-

|-

|-

|-

|-

|-

|-

|-

|-

|-

|-

|-
!colspan=9 style="background:#363c74; color:#e8d3a2;"| Pac-10 Tournament

|-
!colspan=9 style="background:#363c74; color:#e8d3a2;"| NCAA Tournament

References

Washington Huskies
Washington
Washington Huskies men's basketball seasons
Washington
Washington